Peter Tarnoff (born April 19, 1937) served as the Under Secretary of State for Political Affairs during the first Clinton term, from 1993 to 1997.  In May 1997, United States Secretary of State Madeleine Albright presented him the Department of State's highest award, the Distinguished Service Award for extraordinary service in advancing American interests through creative and effective diplomacy.

Tarnoff was President of the Council on Foreign Relations from 1986 until 1993. Before taking up that position, he served as Executive Director of the World Affairs Council of Northern California and President of the International Advisory Corporation. While on sabbatical from the Department of State in 1982–1983, Tarnoff was a lecturer at Stanford University and Georgetown University.

During his career as a Foreign Service Officer, Tarnoff served as Executive Secretary of the Department of State and Special Assistant to Secretaries of State Edmund Muskie and Cyrus Vance (1977–1981); Director, Office of Research and Analysis for Western Europe (1975–76); Special Assistant to Ambassador-at-Large Henry Cabot Lodge Jr. (1967); and Nigerian Analyst in the Bureau of Intelligence and Research (1966–67). His Foreign Service assignments abroad included Deputy Chief of Mission at the American Embassy in Luxembourg (1973–75); one year's study (1970) at the National School of Administration in Paris, followed by an assignment as Principal Officer at the American Consulate General in Lyon, France (1971–73); Special Assistant to the U.S. Ambassador to the Federal Republic of Germany (1969); Special Assistant to the Chief of the American Delegation to the Paris Talks on Vietnam (1968); Special Assistant to the Deputy U.S. Ambassador (1964–65) and the U.S. Ambassador (1965–66), Saigon, Vietnam; and Political Officer at the U.S. Embassy in Lagos, Nigeria (1962–64).

Tarnoff received a Bachelor of Arts in Philosophy from Colgate University in 1958 and pursued postgraduate studies at the University of Chicago and the University of Paris. He lives in San Francisco, California with his wife, Mathea Falco, and had three sons, Nicholas, Alexander and Benjamin.

References

External links

 
Presidents of the Council on Foreign Relations 
1937 births
20th-century American Jews
Under Secretaries of State for Political Affairs
Colgate University alumni
Living people
American expatriates in France
American expatriates in Nigeria
American expatriates in Luxembourg
American expatriates in Vietnam
University of Chicago alumni
United States Foreign Service personnel
21st-century American Jews